Navtej Hundal (died 8 April 2019) was an Indian film and television actor.

Biography
Hundal worked in Hindi and Punjabi films and television series. He graduated from National School of Drama. His daughter Avantika Hundal is a television and film actress. He played the role of home minister in Uri: The Surgical Strike. It was his last film. He also acted in films like Khalnayak and Tere Mere Sapne.

Besides acting in films Hundal acted in television too. He used to take acting classes.

Hundal died on 8 April 2019.

Selected filmography

Film

 Angaaray  (1986)
 Tera Karam Mera Dharam (1987)
 Hathyar (1989)
 Doosra Kanoon (1989)
 Diva Bale Sari Raat (1991)
 Aasmaan Se Gira (1992)
 Yalgaar (1992)
 Kshatriya (1993)
 Khalnayak (1993)
 Himalaya Ke Aanchal Mein (1995)
 Tere Mere Sapne (1996)
 Mein Zulm Ko Mitta Dungi (2001)
 Galtiyaan - The Mistake (2006)
 The Whisperers (2009)
 Uri: The Surgical Strike (2019)

Television
 Bharat Ek Khoj
 Tehkikaat
 Mahabharat

References

External links

Male actors in Hindi cinema
Indian male film actors
2019 deaths
Male actors in Punjabi cinema
Male actors in Hindi television
Indian male television actors
National School of Drama alumni
Year of birth missing